The Aphanothecaceae is a family of cyanobacteria.

References

Chroococcales
Cyanobacteria families